Rubirosa is a Mexican biographical drama web television series produced by 11:11 Films & TV for Claro Video. The series is based on the life of the diplomat, military, car driver and Dominican polo player Porfirio Rubirosa. It stars Manolo Cardona as the titular character. The first season premiered via streaming on 28 November 2018 and consists of 12 episodes.

Cast 
 Manolo Cardona as Porfirio Rubirosa
 Damián Alcázar as Rafael Leonidas Trujillo
 Ana Serradilla as Candelaria Benavente
 Carolina Guerra as Flor de Oro Trujillo
 Héctor Aníbal as John
 Shalim Ortiz as Ramfis Trujillo
 Sergio Luis Boza Gómez as Fulgencio Batista
 Jorge Perugorría as Don Pablo Rubirosa
 Ludwika Paleta as Zsa Zsa Gabor
 Gabriela de la Garza as Barbara Hutton
 Tessa Ía as Adele Chardin (based on Odile Rodin)
 Natalia Varela as Denisse Darraidou (based on Danielle Darrieux)
 Luz Cipriota as Evita Perón
 Katarina Čas as Doris Duke
 Margarita Muñoz as Nina Lobato
 Antonio Von Hildebrand as Porfirio Rubirosa (voice)

Awards and nominations

References

External links 
 

Spanish-language television shows
Mexican television series
2010s Mexican television series
Claro Video original programming
2018 Mexican television series debuts